The Minister and Leader of the House of Commons was a cabinet post in the Parliament of Northern Ireland which governed Northern Ireland from 1921 to 1972.  The position was established in 1966.  It was vacant for two short periods, in 1968 and 1969, and from March 1971 was combined with the post of Minister of State in the Ministry of Development.

There were at least two prior Leaders of the House of Commons, who held the position alongside other ministerial posts:

1964: Ivan Neill
1965: Brian Faulkner

References
The Government of Northern Ireland

House of Commons of Northern Ireland
Executive Committee of the Privy Council of Northern Ireland